The International Federation of Variety Artists (IFVA) was a global union federation bringing together trade unions representing entertainers other than musicians and actors.

History
The International Confederation of Free Trade Unions (ICFTU) organised a World Congress of Intellectual Workers in Brussels in 1951, and the idea for an international organisation of trade unions of variety artists arose.  This led to a conference in Hamburg in 1952, at which the secretariat was established.  Despite the ICFTU's role in its establishment, the IFVA did not affiliate to it, and instead worked closely with the independent International Federation of Musicians and International Federation of Actors (FIA).

One of the smallest international trade secretariats, by 1960, the IFVA had affiliates in five countries, with a total of only 4,045 members.  In 1970, the federation merged into the FIA.

Affiliates
In 1960, the following unions were affiliated to the federation:

Leadership

General Secretaries
1952: Rudi Roeters
1950s: Robert Zagar

Presidents
1952: Willi Feldmann
1950s: Willy Manley
1960s: Vic Duncan

References

Trade unions established in 1952
Trade unions disestablished in 1970
Global union federations
Entertainment industry unions
Actors' trade unions